Callistachys lanceolata, commonly known as the wonnich or native willow, is a species of tree that is native to the South West of Australia. C. lanceolota has the synonym Oxylobium lanceolatum.

Description
The plant has conspicuous and attractive inflorescence composed of racemes with yellow flowers. The plant flowers through the spring time between the months of September to January.
The leaves of the plant are leathery and are arranged in whorls, most typically with three leaves per whorl.

Distribution and habitat
Callistachys lanceolata occurs in the South West corner and South Coast of Western Australia. It grows well in sandy soils in areas that are damp, particularly along watercourses, swamps and culverts.

Taxonomy
The species was first formally described by the botanist Étienne Pierre Ventenat in 1805  work Jardin de la Malmaison . Several synonyms exist for the species, including Chorozema callistachys as described by Ferdinand von Mueller in 1863 in Fragmenta Phytographiae Australiae; Oxylobium callistachys by George Bentham in 1864 in Flora Australiensis and Oxylobium lanceolatum by Karel Domin in 1923 in New Additions to the Flora of Western Australia.

Cultivation
Seeds can be collected from the plant but the pods the seeds are found in should be left to dry on the plant before they are broken open. The seeds should be scarified before sowing.

References

Mirbelioids
Fabales of Australia
Rosids of Western Australia
Trees of Australia